This is a list of  Spanish words that come from Austronesian languages.  It is further divided into words that come from Hawaiian, Javanese, Malay, and Tagalog.  Some of these words have alternate etymologies and may also appear on a list of Spanish words from a different language.

Hawaiian
canaco= Polynesian (adjective) & a Polynesian  person: from Hawaiian kanáka "to be human."

Javanese
junco= junk (ship): from Portuguese junco, from Javanese or Malay jong "boat," "ship."

Malay
bambú= bamboo: probably from Malay bambú "bamboo." 
cacatúa= cockatoo: from Malay kakatua, "cockatoo," from kakak "older sister" + tua "old." 
casuarina= Casuarina: from Malay kěsuari "," + -ina (diminutive suffix).  Named for the similarity in appearance between the little branches of the tree and the feathers of the casuario (see following).
casuario= cassowary: from Malay kěsuari.
compound= compound (enclosure): from Malay "koapong" meaning fenced enclosure.
lancha= launch (boat): from Portuguese lancha, from Malay lancha, lancharan, "boat," from lanchar "velocity without effort," "action of gliding smoothly" (said primarily of boats and turtles).
malayo= a Malay person: from Malay Mělayu, of uncertain origin.
orangután= orangutan: from Malay ōrang hūtan "person of the jungle," from ōrang "man, person" + hūtan "jungle, forest."

Tagalog

See also
Linguistic history of Spanish
List of English words of Spanish origin

References
"Breve diccionario etimológico de la lengua española" by Guido Gómez de Silva

Austronesian
Spanish